Live PD Presents: PD Cam (often referred to as just PD Cam) is an American reality television series and spin-off of Live PD hosted by regular Live PD analyst Sean "Sticks" Larkin. The series premiered on A&E on July 19, 2018. The first season concluded on December 20, 2018. A second season premiered on April 28, 2019 as part of a promotion with Live PD airing through May 5, 2019. It then continued on June 6, 2019. Season 3 began airing on October 24, 2019. Season 4 begin airing Wednesday nights at 8pm from January 22, 2020.

Production
On July 4, 2018 A&E announced the development of a new series called PD Cam, set to premiere on July 19, 2018. Sergeant Sean "Sticks" Larkin of the Tulsa Police Department, already a regular analyst on Live PD, was chosen to host the series. The series was later repackaged as a Live PD spin-off under the title Live PD Presents: PD Cam. It features unfiltered video from police officers responding to calls from their body-worn, dashboard and helicopter cameras.

Speaking about the series, Larkin said that "law enforcement has gotten negative media coverage in recent years" and "the show will help police work become more transparent." A second season began on April 28, 2019 as part of an eleven-day "Ultimate Live PD marathon" followed by a third season that began on October 24, 2019.

Episodes

Season 1 (2018)

Season 2 (2019)

Season 3 (2019)

Season 4 (2020)

References

External links
 

2017 American television series debuts
A&E (TV network) original programming
2010s American reality television series
American television spin-offs
Live PD
Reality television spin-offs
2020s American reality television series